Boggy Gut Creek is a stream in the U.S. state of Georgia. It is a tributary to the Savannah River.

Boggy Gut Creek was so named on account of the boggy soil near its course.

References

Rivers of Georgia (U.S. state)
Rivers of Burke County, Georgia
Rivers of Richmond County, Georgia